Abilene High School is a public secondary school in Abilene, Kansas, United States, serving grades 9–12. The school is operated by Abilene USD 435 school district. The current building serves students from the city itself as well as outlying areas covered by the nearby Chapman district.

Abilene is a member of the Kansas State High School Activities Association and offers a variety of sports programs. Athletic teams compete in class 4A. Extracurricular activities are also offered in the form of performing arts, school publications, and clubs.

Extracurricular activities
The Cowboys compete as the dominant member the North Central Kansas League and are classified as a 4A Div. 1 school, the third-largest classification in Kansas according to the Kansas State High School Activities Association. Throughout its history, Abilene has won many state championships in various sports. Graduates have gone on to participate in Division I, Division II, and Division III athletics. The High School also offers music programs, such as band and choir. A majority of the students go on to state competitions and ensambles, generally receiving high ratings.

Athletics
Abilene High School participates in multiple sports for both boys and girls in the Fall, Winter, and Spring sports seasons.  The boys teams are collectively referred to as the Cowboys while the girls are referred to as the Cowgirls.  The Cowboys\Cowgirls mascot was chosen as a direct reflection of the history of Abilene as a cattle stop at the end of the Chisholm Trail, and the men who braved the long journey of the old days, and the women who welcomed them at the end of the trail.

Football

Since 1966, when AHS joined the North Central Kansas League (NCKL), the football team has won or shared a total of 11 league championships.  The team also won two state championships in 1978 and again in 1987.
The Cowboys football team and rival Chapman High School share a unique part of high school football history.  The two teams first began playing each other competitively in 1892.  According to sports records, this makes the rivalry one of the oldest west of the Mississippi River. It is the 8th oldest in the United States.

State championships
The Abilene Cowboys and Cowgirls have won a total of 30 recognized State Championships

(*) Indicates sport and its associated championship is not officially sanctioned by KSHSAA
(**) Total number of team championships is 29 if the powerlifting championships are included.

Sports offered

Fall
 Football
 Volleyball
 Boys Cross Country
 Girls Cross Country
 Girls Tennis
Winter
 Boys Basketball
 Girls Basketball
 Wrestling
Spring
 Baseball
 Boys Golf
 Boys Tennis
 Softball
 Boys Track and Field
 Girls Track and Field

Notable alumni
 Dwight D. Eisenhower, 34th President of the United States
 Milton S. Eisenhower, younger brother of Dwight D. Eisenhower. President of Kansas State University, Penn State University, and Johns Hopkins University
 Marlin Fitzwater, former White House Press Secretary
 Ted Power, former MLB pitcher, and current AAA Baseball pitching coach for the Louisville Bats organization
 Oscar Stauffer, founder of Stauffer Communications and namesake of the Kansas State High School Activities Association yearly award for Sportscaster and Sportswriter of the Year
 Frank Wattelet, former NFL football player for the St. Louis Rams and New Orleans Saints
 Cody Whitehair, NFL center and guard for Chicago Bears
 Mike Racy, Former NCAA VP, Current Commissioner of the Mid-America Intercollegiate Athletic Association

Notable faculty
 Frank Parent, athletics coach, 1905–1909

See also
 List of high schools in Kansas
 List of unified school districts in Kansas

References

External links

 
 USD 435 School District Boundary Map, KDOT

Public high schools in Kansas
Schools in Dickinson County, Kansas
History of education in the United States